Walditch is a small village in the English county of Dorset, situated in the civil parish of Bothenhampton, about  to the east of the town of Bridport. The name Walditch is derived from an older term Waldyke, which alludes to the village's location: Walditch is located in the valley of a curved hill that encompasses the village; the hill has a dry stone wall still partially in place, which continues over towards Bothenhampton.

Walditch has a real tennis court, on the site of which Henry VII of England played during his visits to the area.

Walditch is composed of Old Walditch (the original Walditch) and lower Walditch, a housing estate built around 1998.

The village no longer has a stated member of clergy; the last person to fill this role being the Rev. Maureen Alchin, who was a local figure.

Walditch formerly lay within the Hundred of Godderthorne.

External links

Villages in Dorset
Real tennis venues